Jean-François Bohnert is a French magistrate. He was appointed as director of the Parquet national financier on 7 October 2019.

Awards and honors 
He was appointed Knight of the Legion of Honor by decree on 30 December 2017.

References

French magistrates
Living people
Year of birth missing (living people)